Thomas Lediard (1685–1743) was an English writer and surveyor.

Life
In early life, by his own account, he was attached to the staff of the Duke of Marlborough, particularly in 1707, on the occasion of the Duke's visit to Charles XII of Sweden. He is assumed to have been there as a diplomat, an attaché to the embassy at Hamburg, seconded as a foreign secretary. He was then for many years secretary to the British envoy extraordinary in Hamburg. There he manageg the opera there, for his chief, Sir Cecil Wych.

Lediard returned to England some time before 1732 and settled in Smith Square, Westminster. In February 1738 he wrote a proposal for Westminster Bridge. Possibly as a consequence, he was appointed Agent and Surveyor of Westminster Bridge. On 13 July 1742 the Crown lands from Westminster Bridge to Charing Cross were granted to him and Sir Joseph Ayloffe, to hold in trust to the Commissioners appointed to build the bridge. On 9 December 1742 Lediard was elected a Fellow of the Royal Society. Early in 1743 he resigned his appointment as Surveyor of the bridge, and died shortly afterwards, in June 1743. He was succeeded in the post by his son Thomas.

Works
In England Lediard brought out The Naval History of England in all its branches, from the Norman Conquest ... to the conclusion of 1734, 2 vols. 1735; The Life of John, Duke of Marlborough, 3 vols. 1736, 2nd edit. 2 vols. 1743, in the preface to which he claims to write from personal knowledge of some of the transactions, and to have had access to important letters and papers; and The History of the Reigns of William III and Mary, and Anne, in continuation of the History of England by Rapin de Thoyras, 3 vols. 1737. He also published translations of the Life of Sethos, by Jean Terrasson, 1732; A History of the Ancient Germans, by Johann Jacob Mascon, 2 vols. 1737; and of A Plan of Civil and Historical Architecture, by Johann Bernhard Fischer von Erlach, 2nd edit. 1738.

Lediard assisted in the etymological work in Nathan Bailey's Dictionarium Britannicum (1736). He is described on the title-page as a "professor of modern languages in Lower Germany". He was the author of Grammatica Anglicana Critica, oder Versuch zu einer vollkommen Grammatic der englischen Sprache, Hamburg (1726); Eine Collection verschiedener Vorstellungen in Illuminationen . . . 1724-8, unter der Direction und von der Invention Thomas Lediard's, Hamburg (1730); and Britannia, an English Opera as it is performed at the New Theatre in the Haymarket, London, 1732. He also edited, with introduction and notes, The German Spy, in familiar letters . . . written by a Gentleman on his Travels to his Friend in England, London, 1738.

Notes

Attribution

1685 births
1743 deaths
English writers
English translators
English surveyors
Fellows of the Royal Society
18th-century British translators